was a mobile entry in the Metal Gear stealth action video game series. It was released in Japan on December 6, 2012. The publisher Konami announced that the game would shut down on December 13, 2013.

Development
The game was confirmed at the Metal Gear 25th anniversary event on August 30, 2012. Several characters and mechs from the Metal Gear series were shown. A promotional image was released depicting characters from Metal Gear Solid 3: Snake Eater, Metal Gear Solid 4: Guns of the Patriots and Metal Gear Solid: Peace Walker. The main game was free, with an ability to purchase DLC content.

Notes

References

External links
Metal Gear Solid: Social Ops official site 
Metal Gear 25th Anniversary special site 
Metal Gear Solid: Social Ops at Metal Gear Wikia

2012 video games
Products_and_services_discontinued_in_2013
Android (operating system) games
IOS games
Video games developed in Japan
Video games produced by Hideo Kojima
Metal Gear spin-off games
Inactive online games
Multiplayer and single-player video games